Goose bumps are tiny bumps on the surface of the skin caused by involuntary muscle contractions at the base of each hair.

Goosebumps may refer to:

Fiction
Goosebumps, a series of children's horror novels by R. L. Stine
Goosebumps (original series)
Goosebumps (video game series)
Goosebumps (TV series), a children's horror series, based on the books
Goosebumps (film), a horror movie, based on the books

Music
"Goosebumps" (Christie Allen song), 1979
"Goosebumps" (Travis Scott song), 2016
"Goosebumps", song by Meghan Trainor from the album Thank You 
"Goosebumps", song by Jerry Lee Lewis from Young Blood
"Goosebumps", song by Seeed from the album Next!

See also
"Goosebumpz", a song by Mac Miller